Marcio de Souza Gregório Júnior (born 14 May 1986), commonly known as Marcinho, is a Brazilian former footballer who played as an attacking midfielder.

Career
He played for a few Brazilian clubs and South Korean side Gyeongnam FC.

On 9 January 2013, Marcinho joined CSKA Sofia in Bulgaria. He signed a one-and-a-half-year contract and took the number 9 shirt. He made his A Group debut on 31 March, in a 3–0 home win over Minyor Pernik and scored his first goal on 6 April, in a 4–3 away victory over Botev Vratsa. On 27 April 2013, Marcinho netted an equalizing goal with a volley in The Eternal Derby against Levski Sofia, which was eventually lost by a score of 1–2.

On 23 January 2017, he signed a 1.5-year contract with Gaziantepspor. He left the club again in May 2017.

NorthEast United
In August 2017, Marcinho signed with Indian Super League franchise NorthEast United, becoming the club's first foreign signing in 2017.

Career statistics

References

External links 
 
 

1986 births
Living people
Brazilian footballers
Association football midfielders
Volta Redonda FC players
Brasiliense Futebol Clube players
Esporte Clube Noroeste players
Sport Club Corinthians Paulista players
Botafogo Futebol Clube (SP) players
Clube Atlético Bragantino players
Itumbiara Esporte Clube players
Guaratinguetá Futebol players
Gyeongnam FC players
PFC CSKA Sofia players
FC Ufa players
K League 1 players
First Professional Football League (Bulgaria) players
Russian Premier League players
Brazilian expatriate footballers
Expatriate footballers in South Korea
Expatriate footballers in Bulgaria
Expatriate footballers in Russia
Brazilian expatriate sportspeople in South Korea
People from Volta Redonda
Sportspeople from Rio de Janeiro (state)